Samuel Groth and Joseph Sirianni were the defending champions, but Groth chose to not participate this year. Sirianni partnered up with Andrew Coelho, but they lost 6–7(6–8), 4–6 against Miles Armstrong and Sadik Kadir in the quarterfinals.
Miles Armstrong and Sadik Kadir won in the final 6–3, 3–6, [10–7] against Peter Luczak and Robert Smeets.

Seeds

Draw

Draw

External links
 Main Draw Doubles

McDonald's Burnie International - Doubles
Burnie International
2009 in Australian tennis